Domhardt is a German surname. Notable people with the surname include:

 Gerd Domhardt (1945–1997), German composer
 Johann Friedrich Domhardt (1712–1781), Prussian administrator

German-language surnames